15th AFCA Awards

Best Film: 
Parasite

The 15th Austin Film Critics Association Awards, honoring the best in filmmaking for 2019, were announced on January 7, 2020.

Winners and nominees

References

External links
 Official website

2019 film awards
2019
2019 in Texas